Coleophora aethiops is a moth of the family Coleophoridae that is endemic to Italy.

References

External links

aethiops
Moths described in 1877
Moths of Europe
Endemic fauna of Italy